The Northwest Indiana Stars were a professional basketball team that played in the Premier Basketball League in the 2012 season.  Based in Crown Point, Indiana, the Stars  played their home games at On the Square Sports Academy.

On January 26, 2012, the PBL announced that they have Released the Stars, along with the Charleston Gunners, from the league due to not meeting league standards.

In their inaugural exhibition season, the Stars were members of the American Basketball Association and known as the Northwestern Indiana Magical Stars.

As of January 1, 2013 the name and all intellectual property was sold to The Parnell Group LLC.

External links
Northwest Indiana Stars website

Former Premier Basketball League teams
Basketball teams in Indiana
Basketball teams in Chicago
Lake County, Indiana
Basketball teams established in 2010
2010 establishments in Indiana